Itahar Assembly constituency is an assembly constituency in Uttar Dinajpur district in the Indian state of West Bengal.

Overview
As per orders of the Delimitation Commission, No. 36 Itahar Assembly constituency covers Itahar community development block.

Itahar Assembly constituency is part of No. 6 Balurghat (Lok Sabha constituency). It was earlier part of Raiganj (Lok Sabha constituency)

Members of Legislative Assembly

Election results

2021
In the 2021 elections, Mosaraf Hussen of AITC defeated his nearest rival Amit Kumar Kundu of BJP.

2016
In the 2016 elections, Amal Acharjee of AITC defeated his nearest rival Srikumar Mukherjee of CPI.

2011
In the 2011 elections, Amal Acharjee of AITC defeated his nearest rival Srikumar Mukherjee of CPI.

.# Swing calculated on Trinamool+Congress vote percentages taken together in 2006.

.# Md. Rakbul Boksh, contesting as an independent candidate, was a rebel Trinamool Congress candidate, he was suspended from the party.

2006
In the 2006 election, Srikumar Mukherjee of CPI defeated Amal Acharjee of INC

 

.# Swing calculated on Trinamool+BJP vote percentages taken together in 2006.

1977–2006
In the 2006, 2001 and 1996 state assembly elections Srikumar Mukherjee of CPI won the 36 Itahar assembly seat defeating his nearest rivals Amal Acharjee of Congress in 2006, Dr. Zainal Abedin of NCP in 2001 and Dr. Zainal Abedin representing Congress in 1996. Contests in most years were multi cornered but only winners and runners are being mentioned. Dr. Zainal Abedin of Congress defeated Swadesh Chaki of CPI in 1991. Swadesh Chaki of CPI defeated Dr. Zainal Abedin of Congress in 1987. Dr. Zainal Abedin of ICS/Congress defeated Basanta Lal Chatterjee of CPI in 1982 and Salil Kumar Guha of CPI(M) in 1977.

1951–1972
Dr. Zainal Abedin of Congress won in 1972, 1971, 1969, 1967 and 1962. Basanta Lal Chatterjee of CPI won in 1957. Banamali Das of Congress won in 1951.

References

Assembly constituencies of West Bengal
Politics of Uttar Dinajpur district